This article highlights the timeline of the establishment of the State Records Authority of New South Wales.

1821
Establishment of the position of Colonial Secretary and Registrar of the Records who is responsible for government administration in New South Wales.

1879
Letter from J.H. Heaton recommending appointment of Dr G.H. Stanley as Keeper of Archives in the Colonial Secretary’s Office. This proposal was not acted on.

1887
First serious proposals for the establishment of an Archives Office made just before the 100th anniversary of white settlement in Australia in 1888. This led to the publication of the History of New South Wales from the Records and the Historical Records of New South Wales under the direction of James Bonwick (1817-1906) who can be regarded as the first official government archivist in NSW (appointed 13 March 1888.)

1888
Proposal by George Burnett Barton (1836-1901) brother of Edmund Barton to establish a repository for public records in NSW

1903
Comment by F. .M. Bladen, Principal Librarian of the Public Library of NSW ‘It is a disgrace to Australia as an enlightened nation that there is no place where the original papers bearing on the discovery of the continent; the exploration and settlement of the states; the constitutional history and records of their courts of law and judicial and political institutions can be consulted by the student of history.’

1910
Opening of the Mitchell Library. Trustees of the Public Library consider ‘that no time should be lost towards the establishment of an Archives Office’

1915
Letter from Sir William Dixson (later benefactor of the Mitchell Library) to the Chief Secretary requesting the establishment of an archives department

1953
Appointment of Allan Horton to the position of Archives Officer at the Public Library of NSW and establishment of Archives Department within the Public Library of NSW

1955
Establishment of Government Records Repository (responsible to the NSW Public Service Board) and work commences on the preparation of archives legislation

1960
Archives Act proclaimed to commence on 1 June 1961

1961
29 June first meeting of the Archives Authority of New South Wales

Original Board members:
Principal Archivist G.D. Richardson
Chairman Dr H S Wyndham CBE, MA, Ed D, Dip Ed 
Deputy Chair Mr G.M.Gray CBE, BA,
Other members The Hon Mr Justice W H Collins LLB,
Mr Senior Inspector J.R.Clancy,
Dr George Mackaness OBE, MA, DLitt, Hon D Sc,
Mr John Metcalfe BA, FLA,
Mr F H Rogers MA, FLA, FNZLA,
Major General J R Stephenson CBE, DSO, ED,
Professor J M Ward MA, LLB

1963
Appointment of Mr R F Doust, BA as Senior Archivist

1964
Site of about  acquired for a permanent repository at Kingswood

1967
Allan Horton appointed as member of the Archives Authority of NSW

1973
Retirement of Gordon Richardson, Principal Archivist and appointment of Russell Doust, Acting Principal Archivist

1975
November 28. Government Records Repository at Kingswood opens

1976
Ian Maclean appointed Principal Archivist

1976
Establishment of the Records Management Office and Archives Office becomes administratively separate from the Public Library of NSW

1978
Archives and Records Management Offices move from the State Library to a new purpose built archives building in Sydney’s historic Rocks area

1979 
City Reading Room opens – for the first time the Archives Office has its own separate reading room and exhibition area

1980
John Cross appointed Principal Archivist

1982
Abolition of the Department of Services (previously the Chief Secretary’s Department)

1985/6
25th anniversary. Archives Act 1960 and 1 June 1986 establishment of Archives Authority of NSW

1987
Allan Horton resigns from the Archives Authority on 31 May making him the longest serving Board member. Reading Room opened at Western Sydney Records Centre

1998
Appointment of David Roberts as Director 
2 June - State Records Act assented to, effective from 1 January 1999

2003
Review of State Records Act

2005
State Records Act (amendment 15 July 2005) and opening of the Stage 6 Building at the Western Sydney Records Centre, Kingswood.

2005/06
Review of State Records by Council on the Cost and Quality of Government

2006
November State Records moves from Arts NSW to the Department of Commerce

2007
The Convict Records of Australia held by State Records NSW and the Archives Office of Tasmania (now part of LINC Tasmania with the State Library of Tasmania) are inscribed onto the International UNESCO Memory of the World Register

2008
Alan Ventress appointed Director

2012
June - Sydney Records Centre at The Rocks closed

2014
Geoff Hinchcliffe appointed Director

2015
November 28. 40 years since Kingswood site opened. The Western Sydney Records Centre comprises the State archives collection and the Government Records Repository.

2016
October 25. State Records renamed as "State Archives and Records Authority of New South Wales" and may be known as State Archives, State Archives NSW or State Archives and Records NSW.

Government agencies of New South Wales
Archives in Australia